Coix  is a genus of Asian and Australian plants in the grass family.

The best-known species is Coix lacryma-jobi, widely called Job's tears. Its variety Coix lacryma-jobi var. ma-yuen is cultivated in many warm regions as a source of food, medicine, and ornamentation.

The generic name is from Ancient Greek κόϊξ (koix), which originally referred to the doum palm (Hyphaene thebaica); the fruits of the doum palm resemble the diaspores of Coix.

Species

Coix aquatica Roxb. - China (Yunnan, Guangdong, Guangxi), Indian Subcontinent, Indochina, Peninsular Malaysia; naturalized in New Guinea
Coix gasteenii B.K.Simon - northern Queensland
Coix lacryma-jobi L. - China , Indian Subcontinent, Southeast Asia; naturalized in other parts of Asia as well as in southern Europe, Africa, the Americas, and various oceanic islands

Formerly Included

see Chionachne Polytoca Tripsacum

Formerly included in
This genus was formerly placed in the Maydeae, now known to be polyphyletic.

Proteins and expression
Members of this genus produce their own variety of α-zein prolamins. These prolamins have undergone unusually rapid evolutionary divergence from closely related grasses, by way of copy-number changes.

References

External links
 The World Online Grass Flora Grassbase: Coix

 
Poaceae genera
Taxa named by Carl Linnaeus
Andropogoneae